Killer is a 1992 Telugu-language action thriller film, written and directed by Fazil, produced by V. B. Rajendra Prasad under his Jagapathi Art Pictures banner. It stars Nagarjuna, Nagma  and the music was composed by Ilaiyaraaja.

Plot 
The movie starts with goons chasing a pregnant woman. Mary, a nurse, helps her, and a boy Eeswar, is born. As the goons find her location, Mary escapes with the child, and a pregnant woman is killed by the goons. Mary takes the child to her house despite having two sons and raises him along with them. Nancy is born to Mary after a while, and Eeswar discovers that Mary is not his biological mother. Due to financial problems, Mary sends Eeswar to an orphanage. Eeswar faces many struggles in the orphanage and becomes an adamant guy who bashes people for money. In that same course, he bashes a police officer. Meanwhile, he gets into a fight with BhupatiRaja's goons. BhupatiRaja knowing about Eeswar offers a huge amount of money to kill Malavika and Sneha at a time within 15 days who live in Hyderabad. Eeswar visits Mary and gives her some money for her treatment and medicines. Mary asks Eeswar about the source of money and warns him not to involve in any illegal activities. Eeswar goes to Hyderabad and fails to kill Malavika and Sneha. Meanwhile, he notices Priya entering Malavika's building and falls in love with her. He follows Priya to enter Malavika's house. So Eeswar manipulates Priya's family as PremKrishna, who is a foreign return. He manipulates Priya and makes her fall for him. Priya reveals that Malavika is her mother's dearest friend, so she has to accept Prem as her fiancé. Meanwhile, Priya discusses her love for Malavika and takes Prem to Malavika's house. Malavika meets Prem, talks with him, and likes him. Malavika invites Prem for lunch. Prem tries to kill them but narrowly evades capture. Meanwhile, BhupatiRaja's son Banerjee meets Eeswar and hands him a flower bouquet that has a bomb fixed to it, and instructs him that it should be exploded by 6:30 p.m. Eeswar goes to Sneha and hands the bouquet to her. Meanwhile, Malavika reveals that she will donate all her assets to the orphanage as BhupatiRaja (Malavika's cousin) is trying to kill them. She also reveals that her husband was appointed as chairman to stop the religious conflicts caused because of BhupatiRaja, who wants to become a leader by bringing down the Government. Malavika's husband prepares a file against BhupatiRaja to hand over to the home minister. BhupatiRaja warns Malavika to return that file to him. But Malavika's husband hands over that file and a case are booked against BhupatiRaja, who is confirmed as accused by the court and sentenced to twelve years in jail. Knowing that BhupatiRaja kills Malavika's husband, Eeswar's father, and mother (Malavika's brother and sister-in-law). As Sneha (the daughter of Malavika's brother) is the only heiress of the property, BhupatiRaja wants to kill both Malavika and Sneha. Knowing this, Eeswar grows a soft corner over them and drops the thought of killing them. Knowing this, Bhpati Raja kidnaps Eeswar's sister and warns him that he would only leave her if he brings Sneha. Leaving with no option, Eeswar kidnaps Sneha and takes him to BhupatiRaja. Knowing this, Malavika goes to Eeswar's house and threatens Mary. Mary reveals that Eeswar's father is Prasad. Malavika realizes that Eeswar is her brother's son. Eeswar fights with goons and saves his sister and Sneha. Finally, Malavika and Eeswar are reunited, and Malavika tells the truth that he is her nephew.

Cast 

 Nagarjuna as Prem Krishna / Eeswar Prasad
 Nagma as Priya
 Sharada as Malavika
 Vijayakumar as Bhupathi Raja
 Allu Ramalingaiyah as Priya's grandfather
 Nirmalamma as Priya's grandmother
 Brahmanandam as S. I. Brahmanandam
 Ahuti Prasad as Raja
 Banerjee as Banerjee
 Giri Babu as Malavika's husband
 Narayana Rao as Ravindra Prasad
 Suthi Velu as Nookaraju
 Kadambari Kiran as theatre artist
 Chidatala Appa Rao as theatre artist
 Chitti Babu as theatre artist
 Sreedhar Surapaneni as Bhupati Raja's assistant
 Hussain
 Narsing Yadav as chief security officer
 Annapurna as Mary
 Rama Prabha as Rama Devi
 Tulasi as Nancy
 Jyothi as Lalitha
 Nirmalamma as Priya's grandmother
 Baby Shamili as Sneha
 Thalapathy Dinesh as Inspector Mohan

Soundtrack 

The music for the film was composed by Ilaiyaraaja with lyrics by Veturi. It was released by LEO Audio company.

Release
The film was dubbed and released in Tamil as Eashwar in October 1992.

References

External links 
 

1992 films
1990s Telugu-language films
Films scored by Ilaiyaraaja
Films directed by Fazil
Indian action thriller films
Films about contract killing in India
1992 action thriller films